Buzaglo may refer to:

 Buzaglo (surname), an Israeli surname
 The Buzaglo test, an idiom in Israel